Pazhanjikadavu is a village situated near Pidavoor, Pathanapuram in Kollam District, Kerala state, India.

Politics
Pazhanjikadavu is a part of Thalavoor Grama panchayat, Pathanapuram Block Panchayat and Kollam district Panchayat. It is a part of Pathanapuram assembly constituency in Mavelikkara (Lok Sabha constituency). K. B. Ganesh Kumar is the current MLA of Pathanapuram. Shri.Kodikkunnil Suresh is the current member of parliament of Mavelikkara.

Geography
Pazhanjikadavu junction is situated in Pathanapuram-Kottarakkara (via Kura) road. It connects places including Parankimamukal, Nadutheri, Randalummoodu etc. to Pathanapuram. It is the main part of the village.

Demographics
Malayalam is the native language of Parankimamukal.

References

Geography of Kollam district
Villages in Kollam district